The Shark Bay worm-lizard (Aprasia haroldi) is a species of lizard in the Pygopodidae family endemic to the Shark Bay region in Western Australia. It is a limbless lizard found burrowing in loose soil in arid areas.

References

Aprasia
Endemic fauna of Australia
Pygopodids of Australia
Reptiles of Western Australia
Reptiles described in 1978
Taxa named by Glen Milton Storr